A fringing reef is one of the three main types of coral reef. It is distinguished from the other main types, barrier reefs and atolls, in that it has either an entirely shallow backreef zone (lagoon) or none at all. If a fringing reef grows directly from the shoreline, then the reef flat extends to the beach and there is no backreef.  In other cases (e.g., most of the Bahamas), fringing reefs may grow hundreds of yards from shore and contain extensive backreef areas within which it contains food and water, examples are Philippines, Indonesia, Timor-Leste, the western coast of Australia, the Caribbean, East Africa, and Red Sea. Charles Darwin believed that fringing reefs are the first kind of reefs to form around a landmass in a long-term reef growth process. The largest fringing coral reef in the world is the Ningaloo Reef, stretching to around  along the coastline of Western Australia.

Barrier reef

Sometimes it is hard to tell the difference between fringing reefs and another type of reef called a barrier reef. One of the ways that these two types of reefs are distinguished is based on the depth of the lagoon in the back reef. Barrier reefs have at least some deep portions; fringing reefs do not. Another major difference is that barrier reefs tend to be much farther away from shore than fringing reefs.

Structure

There are two main components that make up a fringing reef: the reef flat and the reef slope.

Reef flat (back reef) 
The reef flat is the shoreward, flat, broadest area of the reef. The reef flat is found in fairly shallow water and can be uncovered during low tide. This area of the reef is only slightly sloped towards the open ocean. Since the reef flat is adjacent or nearly adjacent to land, it sustains the most damage from runoff and sediments. Typically, few of the flat's corals are alive. Seagrasses, seaweeds, and soft corals are often found there.

Reef slope (fore reef)
The reef slope is found at the outer edge of the fringing reef, closest to the open ocean. This area of the reef is often quite steep and descends either to a relatively shallow sand bottom or to depths too great to allow the growth of coral. Coral grows much more abundantly on this slope, both in numbers and in species diversity. This is mostly because runoff and sediments are less concentrated here. Greater wave action disperses pollutants and carries nutrients to this area. A common feature on the fore reef is spur and groove formations which transport sediment downslope in the groove.

The upper portion of this slope is called the reef crest. The crest has the best balance between sunlight and waves, so coral grows fastest here. The base of the slope receives the least sunlight and has the least growth out of the whole slope.

Distribution of Fringing reefs

Fringing reefs are located near shore in the tropics in many areas and are the most common reef type. Many of the Great Barrier Reef's components are actually fringing reefs. Of the close to 3,400 individual reefs, 760 are fringing reefs. Fringing reefs are the most common type of reef found in the Philippines, Indonesia, Timor-Leste, the western coast of Australia, the Caribbean, East Africa, and Red Sea.

The largest fringing coral reef in the world is the Ningaloo Reef, stretching to around  along the coastline of Western Australia.

Development of Fringing Reefs

The most important determinant of reef growth is available space as determined by sea level changes. Sea level changes are mostly a result of glaciation or plate tectonics. Tectonic activity can have detrimental effects. An earthquake on Ranongga in the Solomon Islands moved 80% of its fringing reef permanently above sea level. Northern reefs became elevated 1m above the high tide water height, whereas on the south side reefs moved 2 to 3m above the water height.

Keep-up reefs grow at the same rate that sea level rises.  Catch-up reefs initially grow more slowly than sea level rises but eventually catch up when the rise in sea level slows or stops. Give-up reefs are not able to grow fast enough and are "drowned out". There are six different major ways in which fringing reefs grow and develop.

 Reefs can develop vertically as far as the space below the surface allows. The reef generally grows upward from a starting point towards the surface. Once the reef crest reaches sea level the reef may begin growing seaward. Growth begins after flooding, mostly from parts of the reef that have died. Because the reef grows upward, the oldest sediments are found lower in the reef. The reef flat's age indicates when the reef reached sea level. Catch-up reefs have younger surfaces than keep-up reefs of this type.
 Reefs can expand seaward from the shore. This requires a fairly constant sea level. If the sea level drops, the reef flat in more seaward areas slopes downward.
 Reefs can grow atop muddy sediments which can predate the reef or accrete along with the reef's growth. These reefs also grow seaward from the shore. Older sediments are closest to shore and are not buried. Coral, seagrass and algae filter sediment before it is placed on the reef crest.
 Reefs can form in a gradual, sporadic manner, with alternate vertical and horizontal growth episodes.  In this type of fringing reef formation there are multiple separate reefs that are found parallel to the shore and the original fringing reef. These reefs become a single, large reef when reef sediments fill in the spaces between the different reefs.
 Reefs can develop when an offshore reef grows to sea level, forming a barrier. When the crest grows faster than the flat, a lagoon forms. The lagoon then fills with inshore sediments.
 Offshore reefs can form their barrier using storms to move coral and other debris inwards. The recurring storms continually reshape the seaward side of such reefs.

Ecology

As with other types of reefs, there are many reasons of fringing reef destruction. Destructive fishing practices, such as cyanide fishing, blast fishing, bottom trawling, and muro-ami (banging on the reef with sticks), may have detrimental effects. Bottom-trawling is one of the greatest threats to cold-water coral reefs. Overfishing affects the ecological balance of coral reef communities, disrupting the food chain and causing effects far beyond the directly overfished population. Tourism such as careless boating, diving, snorkeling, and fishing, with people touching reefs, stirring up sediment, collecting coral, and dropping anchors on reefs, can destroy the reefs. Some tourist resorts and infrastructure have been built directly on top of reefs, and some resorts empty their sewage or other wastes directly into water surrounding coral reefs. 

Toxins from marine pollution are dumped directly into the ocean or carried by river systems from sources upstream. Some pollutants, such as sewage and runoff from farming, increase the level of nitrogen in seawater, causing an overgrowth of algae, which cuts off sunlight from the reefs. Erosion caused by construction (both along coasts and inland), mining, logging, and farming is leading to increased sediment in rivers. This ends up in the ocean, where it can smother corals by depriving them of the light needed to survive. The destruction of mangrove forests, which normally trap large amounts of sediment, is exacerbating the problem. Mining of live coral is used as bricks, road fill, or cement for new buildings. Corals are also sold as souvenirs to tourists and to exporters and harvested for the live rock trade.

Corals cannot survive if the water temperature is too high. Global warming has already led to increased levels of coral bleaching, and this is predicted to increase in frequency and severity in the coming decades. Such bleaching events may cause already stressed coral reefs and reef ecosystems to completely die.

Species diversity

The backreef area has the least species diversity, which increases seaward towards the reef crest.  Some of this difference is the result of eutrophication from increased nutrients, sediments and toxicity from domestic and industrial wastes. More macrophytes live on the bottom because of the increase in nutrients. This increase in nutrients has caused an increase in the number of phytoplankton that are present above the coral reef. The increase in phytoplankton has led to reduced light reaching the coral species and has also led to a greater number of larger invertebrates. The sediments that are present within the environment cause increased turbidity and may smother some organisms. The corals present on the fringing reefs use four processes to get rid of sediments which include polyp distension, tentacular movement, ciliary action and mucus production.

In the area of the reef closest to the shore there is generally a lot of fleshy algae which forms on sand and coral rubble. These types of algae include Lyngbia sp.  and Oscilatoria sp. Over recent years the dominant species in the reef flat have been affected by environmental changes. On fringing reefs in Barbados, species such as Diploria strigosa, Palythoa mamillosa, and Diadema antillarum are found. 

The reef crest's most common species is Porites porites, a type of stony coral, although there are also significant areas covered in flesh-like algae.

See also
List of reefs

References

External links
Darwinian Literature on Fringing Reefs 
Algal Species Found On A Fringing Reef After A Natural Disaster
 NOAA National Ocean Service - What are the three main types of coral reefs?

Coral reefs